Thomas Swarbrick (c. 1675 – c. 1753) (sometime Schwarbrook) was an organ builder active in England in the eighteenth century.

History

He learned his trade as an apprentice to the famous builder Renatus Harris. He appears to be working on his own by 1706 when he rebuilt an organ in St Alphege’s Church, Greenwich.

His most famous organ is that in St Michael’s Church, Coventry of 1733.

His nephew, Henry Swarbrick, was organist of Hereford Cathedral from 1720 to 1754.

Works
1703 St Saviour's Church, Southwark
1705 All Saints' Church, Northampton
1706 St Alphege’s Church, Greenwich
1710 Residence of Other Windsor, 2nd Earl of Plymouth, Bromsgrove
1713 St Nicholas' Church, Bristol
1714 St Michael's Church, Minehead
1715 St Philip's Church, Birmingham
1716 St Chad's Church, Shrewsbury
1717 St Mary’s Collegiate Church, Warwick
1718 St Cuthbert's Church, Wells
1719 Vicar's Hall, Wells
1723 St Mary Magdalene's Church, Launceston
1725 St Martin's Church, Birmingham (transferred to St. Alphege's Church, Solihull)
1731 Holy Trinity Church, Stratford upon Avon
1732 Southwell Minster
1733 St Michael's Church, Coventry
1735 Lincoln Cathedral (repairs)
1736 Magdalen College, Oxford 
1737 St Nicholas Church, Stanford on Avon
1739 St Thomas' Church, Salisbury
1740 Lichfield Cathedral
1742 St Mary's Church, Nottingham (case now in Church of St Peter and St Paul, Uppingham)
1744 Christ Church, Bristol
1744 Church of St Peter and St Paul, Shepton Mallet
1752 Worcester Cathedral (repairs)

References

Organ builders of the United Kingdom